Lonesome Lake is an alpine lake in Custer County, Idaho, United States, located in the White Cloud Mountains in the Sawtooth National Recreation Area.  The lake is accessed from Sawtooth National Forest trail 683.

Lonesome Lake is northwest of Merriam Peak and located in the lower section of the Boulder Chain Lakes Basin.  It is the highest elevation named lake in the Sawtooth National Recreation Area.

References

See also
 List of lakes of the White Cloud Mountains
 Sawtooth National Recreation Area
 White Cloud Mountains

Lakes of Idaho
Lakes of Custer County, Idaho
Glacial lakes of the United States
Glacial lakes of the Sawtooth National Forest